Mercury(II) cyanide, also known as mercuric cyanide, is a poisonous compound of mercury and cyanide. It is an odorless, toxic white powder. It is highly soluble in polar solvents such as water, alcohol, and ammonia; slightly soluble in ether; and insoluble in benzene and other hydrophobic solvents.

Molecular and crystal structure
At ambient temperature and ambient pressure, Hg(CN)2 takes the form of tetragonal crystals. These crystals are composed of nearly linear Hg(CN)2 molecules with a C-Hg-C bond angle of 175.0° and an Hg-C-N bond angle of 177.0° (Aylett gives slightly different values of 189° and 175°, respectively). Raman spectra show that the molecules distort at higher pressures. Between 16-20 kbar, the structure undergoes a phase transition as the Hg(II) center changes from 2- to 4-coordinate as the CN groups bind to neighboring Hg centers forming via Hg-N bonds. The coordination geometry thus changes from tetragonal to tetrahedral, forming a cubic crystal structure, analogous to the structure of Cd(CN)2. Due to the ambidentate nature of the CN ligands, this tetrahedral structure is distorted, but the distortion lessens with increasing pressure until the structure becomes nearly perfectly tetrahedral at >40 kbar.

As in the solid state, in aqueous solution, Hg(CN)2 molecules are linear.

Synthesis
Mercuric cyanide can be prepared by mixing yellow mercury oxide with hydrocyanic acid in the following chemical reaction which is generally carried out by passing HCN gas into HgO in water. When soluble Hg(CN)2 is formed, the solution is evaporated to crystallize the product.

 HgO + 2 HCN → Hg(CN)2 + H2O

Hg(CN)2 can also be prepared by mixing HgO with finely powdered Prussian blue. In addition, it can be produced by reacting mercuric sulfate with potassium ferrocyanide in water:

 K4Fe(CN)6 + 3 HgSO4 → 3 Hg(CN)2 + 2 K2SO4 + FeSO4

Another method to generate mercuric cyanide is through the disproportionation of mercury(I) derivatives. In these reactions, metallic mercury precipitates, and Hg(CN)2 remains in solution:
 Hg2(NO3)2 + 2 KCN → Hg + Hg(CN)2 + 2 KNO3

Reactions
It rapidly decomposes in acid to give off hydrogen cyanide. It is photosensitive, becoming darker in color.

Mercury cyanide catalyzes the Koenigs–Knorr reaction for the synthesis of glycosides. Cyanogen, (CN)2, forms upon heating dry mercury cyanide, but the method is inferior to other routes:
 Hg(CN)2 → (CN)2 + Hg

Coordination polymers can be synthesized from Hg(CN)2 building blocks. Large single crystals of [(tmeda)Cu-[Hg(CN)2]2][HgCl4] form upon treating CuCl2, the soft Lewis acid Hg(CN)2, and N,N,N',N'-tetramethylethylenediamine (TMEDA). The migration of two labile chloride ligands from harder Cu(II) to softer Hg(II) drives the formation of the crystal.

Past applications
The use of mercuric cyanide as an antiseptic was discontinued due to its toxicity.  Hg(CN)2 is also used in photography. It is still used in homeopathy under the Latin name Hydrargyrum bicyanatum.

Toxicology

Mercury(II) cyanide is poison with health hazard classification 3, having an oral LD50 of 33 milligrams per kilogram in mice and a subcutaneous LD50 of 2.7 milligrams per kilogram in dogs.

References

External links

 National Pollutant Inventory: Cyanide compounds fact sheet
 National Pollutant Inventory: Mercury and compounds fact sheet

Mercury(II) compounds
Cyanides